Nineveh is an unincorporated community in Nineveh Township, Adair County, Missouri, United States.

History
Nineveh was founded in 1849 by a small colony of German settlers from Bethel, Missouri who wanted to create a communal society. A post office called Nineveh was established in 1852, and remained in operation until 1882. The community was named after the ancient city of Nineveh.

References

Unincorporated communities in Adair County, Missouri
1849 establishments in Missouri
Unincorporated communities in Missouri